Zodarion mallorca is a spider species found in Majorca.

See also 
 List of Zodariidae species

References

External links 

mallorca
Fauna of Mallorca
Spiders of Europe
Spiders described in 1994